VODO is an online media distributor offering films, books, games and music under pay-what-you-want pricing models. Founded by film director Jamie King, VODO has recently focused on bundle offers, bringing together a variety of creators under the themes of H.P. Lovecraft, Big Brother (surveillance and privacy), NSFW (sex positive culture), Otherworlds (sci-fi) and Really Creepy (indie horror).

VODO's background is in distribution of film under Creative Commons licenses, using the BitTorrent protocol. Filmmakers can upload films on the site and selected works are also promoted on third-party sites and services such as the Butter Project, uTorrent and The Pirate Bay.

Past releases include sci-fi series Pioneer One, The Yes Men Fix the World and Zenith. Users are encouraged to donate after watching the films, and the highest earning to date has received almost $100,000.

VODO releases
As of February 2012, VODO hosts a total of 148 films. Some of the most known are listed below.

Free Film Fund 
As from 17 January 2012, five percent of all VODO income was allocated to the Free Film Fund, an online fundraising forum for the development of free-to-share productions.

References

External links
 

Film distributors
Creative Commons-licensed films